Puyan Shunze Temple, is a temple in Puyan Township, Changhua County, Taiwan. It mainly serves Xuanwu as their traditional religious center in the Puyan village of Puyan Township.

Gallery

References

External links 

 

Taoist temples in Taiwan
Temples in Changhua County